Fontana Records is a record label that was started in the 1950s as a subsidiary of the Dutch Philips Records. The independent label distributor Fontana Distribution takes its name from the label.

History
Fontana started in the 1950s as a subsidiary of the Dutch Philips Records; when Philips restructured its music operations, it dropped Fontana in favor of Vertigo Records.
 
Fontana's U.S. counterpart label was started in 1964 and distributed by Philips US subsidiary Mercury Records.  The initial single release (F 1501) was a wild teen beat instrumental by famed British session drummer Bobby Graham, both sides featuring Jimmy Page on guitar. Among the hitmakers were Wayne Fontana & the Mindbenders (then later on their own, simply as the Mindbenders), the Troggs, the New Vaudeville Band, Manfred Mann, Dave Dee, Dozy, Beaky, Mick & Tich, and Steam, all of whom had No. 1 hits on the label.  Other successful Fontana artists included the Silkie, Nana Mouskouri, the Pretty Things, the Herd, Gloria Lynne and the duo of Jane Birkin & Serge Gainsbourg.  The label also served as an outlet for other British acts such as the Merseybeats, the Others, Eden Kane, the Escorts and Sight & Sound. Fontna released southern soul 45s such as the Pallbeares also.

In some cases, Fontana was early on artists who achieved greater fame and fortune with subsequent releases for other labels, like the Spencer Davis Group, the Guess Who, Don Partridge and Helen Reddy. Notably, in 1964, a group calling themselves The High Numbers released their first single, "I'm The Face"/"Zoot Suit." They achieved worldwide success after changing labels and management, and changing their name to The Who. It was also an outlet for some of the productions James Brown recorded under his deal with sister label Smash Records including Vicki Anderson. 

Fontana's British division was the UK licensee for Motown Records (in 1961), Columbia Records and Epic Records (until 1962), Vanguard Records (until 1967), Mainstream Records and ESP-Disk. As with Philips, labels were blue for singles, black for EPs and LPs.

In the UK and Europe, the Fontana label was largely dormant after 1974, although in 1980–81 it was used for releases by Sector 27 and Dennis Bovell. Fontana was revived in the 1980s as an outlet for acts such as Tears for Fears, the Teardrop Explodes, Pere Ubu, Cocteau Twins and Swing Out Sister, and was active in the 1990s, releasing music for acts such as House of Love, Gorky's Zygotic Mynci, Ocean Colour Scene, Oleta Adams and James. It is currently an active division of Fontana Distribution, using the same logo.

In 2009 the label released Brooke Hogan's  album. The Fontana UK website is at WIX.

US label variations
1964—Pink label
1965-1970—Light blue or slightly darker-toned blue label (some of these labels were stamped with an "S")
1980s—Black and silver label

See also
 List of record labels

References

External links
 Fontana story from BSN Pubs
 A discography of American Fontana albums in the 1960s and early 1970s
 A discography of American Fontana singles in the 1960s and early 1970s
 A discography of UK Fontana singles from 1958 to 1974
 A discography of Australian Fontana singles

Record labels established in 1954
Record labels disestablished in 1970
Re-established companies
Dutch record labels
Philips
Labels distributed by Universal Music Group